Child in Reverse is the fifth studio album by Australian singer-songwriter Kate Miller-Heidke. The album was announced on 6 August 2020 and released on 30 October 2020.

Child in Reverse is Miller-Heidke's first studio album in six years, following on from 2014's O Vertigo!. It has been described by her team as "her most pop album yet".

At the 2021 ARIA Music Awards, Tony Espie was nominated for Engineer of the Year for work on this album.

A deluxe edition was released on 18 March 2022.

Background
The album was recorded in Melbourne, produced by Evan Klar and features 11 songs about love and fear, memory and empathy, rage and redemption. Miller-Heidke said "What I love about Evan's style is his freshness, a feeling of spontaneity. Musically the whole album came together really smoothly. I think that comes across when you listen to it."

Despite her achievements in opera, musical theatre and screen production in recent years, Miller-Heidke said she keeps "..getting drawn back to pop music". Miller-Heidke said "The minimalism, the economy... I find that incredibly rewarding and challenging. It's like a quest to nail the perfect pop song. When it can be done, for me, as a listener, it's my favourite music."

Reception

Guido Farnell from The Music AU said "Child in Reverse delivers eleven nuggets of finely crafted pop tunes that are soft, dreamy and impossibly silky smooth whilst moving to compulsive grooves." Farnell commented on Miller-Heidke's lyrics saying "[She] is in an introspective mood, dealing with difficult haunting memories, disappointment and the hurt of a broken heart" adding "the struggle is real but a light touch, with airy synths and sweet pop hooks complete with the cheeky little operatic trills Miller-Heidke likes to slip in here and there, prevents this line of thought from getting completely depressing. This approach manoeuvres the album to a place where Miller-Heidke and listeners can find inner strength rather than defeat". Farrell concluded saying the album "is adult pop music which, presented in fresh feel good tones, runs very deep."

ABC said "Miller-Heidke once again gives us appealing, boundary-pushing pop music that is always refreshing, often emotional, and as thought-provoking as you want it to be" calling the album "Refreshing, poignant and playful art-pop".

Track listing

Charts

References

2020 albums
EMI Records albums
Kate Miller-Heidke albums